Economic Party refers to:
Economic Party (Italy)
Economic Party (South West Africa)